This is a list of members of the South Australian House of Assembly from 1890 to 1893, as elected at the 1890 colonial election:

 Yatala MHA James Cowan was killed in an accident on 21 July 1890, only two months after his election. Richard Butler won the resulting by-election on 13 August.
 Wooroora MHA Hugh Craine Kelly died on 13 January 1891. Robert Kelly won the resulting by-election on 25 February..
 Wallaroo MHA David Bews died on 24 February 1891. Independent Labor candidate Richard Hooper won the resulting by-election on 23 May.
 Northern Territory MHA Vaiben Louis Solomon resigned on 5 March 1891. He was re-elected in the resulting by-election on 23 and 25 May.
 East Adelaide MHA John Cox Bray resigned on 6 January 1892. Labor candidate John McPherson won the resulting by-election on 23 January.
 Noarlunga MHA Charles Dashwood resigned on 24 February 1892. William Blacker won the resulting by-election on 26 March.

References

Members of South Australian parliaments by term
19th-century Australian politicians